Olaf Hoffsbakken (2 September 1908 – 23 November 1986) was a Norwegian Nordic skier who competed in the 1930s. He won two silver medals at the 1936 Winter Olympics in Garmisch-Partenkirchen in both the Nordic combined and the 4 × 10 km relay.

In addition, he won a complete set of medals at the FIS Nordic World Ski Championships. This included a gold in the Nordic combined (1938), a silver in the 4 × 10 km relay (1935), and a bronze in the 18 km (1935).

Hoffsbakken won the Holmenkollen ski festival's Nordic combined event twice (1936 and 1939). In 1937, he shared the Holmenkollen medal with fellow Norwegians Birger Ruud and Martin P. Vangsli.

Cross-country skiing results
All results are sourced from the International Ski Federation (FIS).

Olympic Games
 1 medal – (1 silver)

World Championships
 2 medals – (1 silver, 1 bronze)

References

External links
. Cross-country skiing
. Nordic combined
Holmenkollen medalists - click Holmenkollmedaljen for downloadable pdf file 
Holmenkollen winners since 1892 - click Vinnere for downloadable pdf file 
profile

1908 births
1986 deaths
Holmenkollen medalists
Holmenkollen Ski Festival winners
Norwegian male Nordic combined skiers
Norwegian male cross-country skiers
Olympic cross-country skiers of Norway
Olympic Nordic combined skiers of Norway
Cross-country skiers at the 1936 Winter Olympics
Nordic combined skiers at the 1936 Winter Olympics
Olympic silver medalists for Norway
Olympic medalists in cross-country skiing
Olympic medalists in Nordic combined
FIS Nordic World Ski Championships medalists in cross-country skiing
FIS Nordic World Ski Championships medalists in Nordic combined
Medalists at the 1936 Winter Olympics
20th-century Norwegian people